Telecinco Estrellas was a Spanish television channel operated by Gestevisión Telecinco. It is available 24 hours a day on digital terrestrial (TDT in Spain), satellite and cable. The channel specialises in drama and comedy programmes from around the world. Examples of programming include Mentes Criminales (Criminal Minds) and Yo Soy Bea a local version of Betty la Fea (Ugly Betty).

On 18 February 2008, the channel was closed, and the frequency was given to FDF Telecinco (FDF)

References

External links
 Official website

Telecinco
Defunct television channels in Spain
Television channels and stations established in 2005
Television channels and stations disestablished in 2008
Spanish-language television stations
Channels of Mediaset España Comunicación

fr:Telecinco Estrellas